Phausis reticulata, commonly referred to as the blue ghost, is a species of firefly found in the eastern and central United States. The species is common in the southern Appalachians, and can be seen in Great Smoky Mountains National Park, the Chattahoochee National Forest, as well as North Carolina's DuPont State Forest and Pisgah National Forest.

Description
The males of this all-brown species have a short second antennomere (compared to the third) as well as large eyes. Unlike many firefly species found in the eastern and central United States, P. reticulata males display a steady glow, instead of a species-specific flashing pattern. The light emitted by "blue ghost" fireflies appears to the human eye as blueish-white when observed at night from a distance, but bright green when examined at close range. This discrepancy in the observed color may be due to the Purkinje effect.

Female blue ghosts are wingless, unable to fly, and are paedomorphic, remaining in larval form through adulthood.

Mating
The blue ghost fireflies’ ideal conditions for mating season include warm and moist forest areas that are surrounded by spongy leaf litter. The male fireflies fly a few feet off the ground, spotting glowing females.

References

External links
Discover Life in America website
 Times News Article

Lampyridae
Bioluminescent insects
Beetles of North America
Taxa named by Thomas Say
Beetles described in 1825